Lindsay Allan Clark (born 1 May 1944) is a former New Zealand rugby union player. A prop, Clark represented Otago at a provincial level, and was called into the New Zealand national side, the All Blacks, as a replacement for Keith Murdoch on the 1972–73 tour of Britain, Ireland, France and North America. He played seven matches on that tour, but did not appear in any internationals.

References

1944 births
Living people
Rugby union players from Dunedin
People educated at King's High School, Dunedin
New Zealand rugby union players
New Zealand international rugby union players
Otago rugby union players
Rugby union props